Robert Lloyd Fish (August 21, 1912 – February 23, 1981)  was an American writer of crime fiction.

Biography

Early life
Fish was born in Cleveland, Ohio, and studied engineering at Case School of Applied Science, where he graduated in 1933. Thereafter, he had a successful career in engineering management and consultancy, working in several countries that he later used as settings for his stories. He served for three years with the Ohio National Guard 37th Infantry Division.

Writing career
In 1953 he travelled to Rio de Janeiro, as an engineering consultant to a Brazilian vinyl plastics factory In 1960, Fish submitted his first short story to Ellery Queen's Mystery Magazine. He subsequently wrote over 30 novels and numerous short stories.

His first novel, The Fugitive, gained him the Mystery Writers of America's Edgar Allan Poe Award for best first novel in 1962, and his short story "Moonlight Gardener" was awarded the Edgar for best short story in 1972. His 1963 novel Mute Witness, written under the pseudonym Robert L. Pike, was filmed in 1968 as Bullitt, starring Steve McQueen. The same happens his 1967 novel Always Kill A Stranger was filmed in 1972 as Missão: Matar, starring Tarcisio Meira, Yvonne Buchingham.

He also wrote the novel Pursuit (adapted into a two-part TV miniseries  Twist of Fate), and the Holmes parody The Memoirs of Schlock Homes.

In 1963, Fish completed Jack London's unfinished novel The Assassination Bureau, Ltd based on the unfinished manuscript with additional notes by London and an ending outline done by London's wife Charmian shortly before her death in 1955.

Death
Fish died in February 1981 at his home in Trumbull, Connecticut.

Awards

 1962 Mystery Writers of America's Edgar Allan Poe Award for best first novel: The Fugitive
 1972 Edgar Allan Poe Award for best short story: "Moonlight Gardener", Argosy, December 1971

Two other short stories, "Double Entry" (EQMM, January 1969) and "Hijack" (Playboy, August 1972), were nominated for Edgars in the "best short story" category, but did not win the award.

Legacy
The Robert L. Fish Memorial Award, sponsored by the author's estate, has been awarded annually since 1984 by the Mystery Writers of America for the best first short story by an American author.

Selected bibliography 
 The Fugitive (Captain Jose Da Silva Mystery #1 ),  (1962)
 Mute Witness, (1963) written under the pseudonym Robert L. Pike, was filmed in 1968 as Bullitt
 Isle of the Snakes (Captain Jose Da Silva Mystery #2 ), (1963)
 The Shrunken Head (Captain Jose Da Silva Mystery #3 ), (1963)
 The Diamond Bubble (Captain Jose Da Silva Mystery #5 ), (1966)
 Always Kill A Stranger (Captain Jose Da Silva Mystery #6   (1967), was filmed in 1972 as Missão Matar 
 The Murder League (1968)
 The Bridge That Went Nowhere (Captain Jose Da Silva Mystery #7 ), (1968)
 The Xavier Affair (Captain Jose Da Silva Mystery #8), (1970)
 The Green Hell Treasure (Captain Jose Da Silva Mystery #9 ), (1971)
Trouble in Paradise (Captain Jose Da Silva Mystery #10 ), (1975)
 Pursuit (1978)My life and the beautiful game, with Pelé, Edson Arantes do Nascimento, one of your biographies (1978).Brazilian Sleigh Ride'' (Captain Jose Da Silva Mystery #4 ), (1988)

References

American mystery writers
20th-century American novelists
Edgar Award winners
1912 births
1981 deaths
Writers from Cleveland
American male novelists
American male short story writers
20th-century American short story writers
People from Trumbull, Connecticut
20th-century American male writers
Novelists from Ohio
Case Western Reserve University alumni